Saulteaux First Nation ("the Saulteaux at Jackfish Lake") is a Saulteaux Anishinaabe First Nation band government, whose reserves are located near Cochin, Saskatchewan. In February 2012, the First Nation had a total of 1,225 registered members, of which 604 lived on their own reserve.

Reserves 
Of these tracts, the  Saulteaux Indian Reserve 159 serves as their main reserve.

Government 
Under the Canadian Indian Act, the First Nation elects their leadership under the Custom Electoral System. Their current elected officials are Chief Kenny Moccasin and five councillors: Jordan Gopher, Rebecca Gopher, Adam Houle, Dolphus Moccasin, Gabriel Moccasin . 

The First Nation government provides infrastructure to their member; the infrastructure includes a band office, band hall, fire hall, school, clinic, arena, and various structures required for the band's maintenance. In turn, the Saulteaux First Nation's council is a member of the Battlefords Agency Tribal Chiefs, a local Chief Council, who together with other members, provide additional services to their constituency. In turn, the First Nation is also a member of the Confederacy of Treaty Six First Nations, a Tribal Political Organisation representing First Nations who are signatories to Treaty 6.

References

External links 

Anishinaabe reserves in Canada
Saulteaux